Paul Taylor (born 26 July 1959) is an Australian former professional rugby league footballer who played in the 1980s and 1990s. He played at club level for Parramatta Eels (Heritage No. 385) for nine season between 1981-1989, Oldham (Heritage No. 891) (two spells) in 1984 and 1989, Wakefield Trinity (Heritage No. 1015) in 1989-90, and Penrith Panthers (Heritage No. 295) in 1990 before retiring.

Playing career
Taylor played in four grand finals for Parramatta Eels including three winning premiership teams in 1982, 1983 and 1986. He was also listed as a reserve in Parramatta's first grand final win in 1981. Taylor was the favoured  during the Jack Gibson era at Parramatta and played a total of 150 first grade games with the club.

In 2013, Taylor spoke to the media about his time at Parramatta saying "I always thought I was under par in talent compared to the other blokes but I had endurance,So I had to work out how to fit in once I got in there, and that meant looking at the speed and ability of the side and working out what I could bring to the table. I just tried to be the fittest bloke at the club, and in the end it worked out well".

In a brilliant club career, two highlights include (1) in a club game during the 1981 season, Paul Taylor made an astonishing 52 tackles in a match, and (2) during the 1988 season he equaled a club record by scoring 4 tries in a match against Canberra Raiders. Unfortunately, he was always overlooked as a representative player.

After a bitter dispute with Parramatta during the 1989 off season, Taylor moved to the Penrith Panthers. He only played 3 games for the Panthers in 1990 before a broken collarbone ended his career.

Post playing
Taylor later coached at club level for Central Coast

In 1996, Taylor was made a life member of the Parramatta Eels.

References

External links
Statistics at orl-heritagetrust.org.uk

1959 births
Australian rugby league coaches
Australian rugby league players
Living people
Oldham R.L.F.C. players
Parramatta Eels players
Penrith Panthers players
Rugby league five-eighths
Rugby league fullbacks
Rugby league halfbacks
Rugby league hookers
Rugby league locks
Rugby league second-rows
Rugby league utility players
Wakefield Trinity players
Place of birth missing (living people)